Pchela (meaning Bee in English) is a village in Bulgaria, located near the town of Elhovo in Yambol Province. As of 2008 it had a population of 445. Its former name was Isebeglyi. The location of the village was changed twice in the 18th century, due to the spread of plagues.

References and notes

Villages in Yambol Province